Chad Lee Magendanz (born May 24, 1967) is an American software developer and politician. A Republican, he served two terms in the Washington House of Representatives for the 5th district, comprising much of the eastern third of King County. Magendanz was the ranking member on the House Education Committee and served on the House Appropriations and House Technology and Economic Development committees. He previously served as the Issaquah School Board president. Magendanz was endorsed by The Seattle Times in 2012, 2014, 2018, and 2022 and consistently received an Outstanding rating from the Municipal League of King County.

Personal life 
Magendanz enrolled in Cornell University in 1985 and graduated with a degree in electrical engineering. After graduating, Magendanz served in the United States Navy until 1997 as a nuclear submarine officer and was honorably discharged as a lieutenant.

Magendanz entered into a career of software development working for Microsoft, where he shipped 16 products and earned over 20 patent awards. Magendanz currently works as director of special projects for Voter Science, LLC and teaches computer science in the Bellevue School District.  He earned his Master of Arts in teaching from Central Washington University in the spring of 2021.

He and his wife of 32 years, Galen, reside in Issaquah, Washington, and have two sons.

Political career 
Magendanz was appointed a member of the Issaquah School Board in 2008, and elected to that position in 2009. He served as the school board legislative representative from 2009–10 and was elected president from 2011 to 2012. He resigned in 2013 after being elected to the state legislature.

He was first sworn into the Washington State House of Representatives in 2013, representing the 5th district, a position he held until January 2017.

In the House, Magendanz was the ranking minority member on the Education Committee. He also served on the Appropriations and Technology and Economic Development committees.

Magendanz was appointed three times to education funding committees tasked with finding ways to provide high levels of educational achievement despite budget shortfalls. The committees were charged with examining staff compensation, the sources of school funding and collective bargaining agreements.

In 2016, Magendanz opted to run for a seat in the Washington State Senate representing the 5th district. He wound up losing a close race  to the incumbent, Mark Mullet, and has since returned to private life.

Major Legislative Accomplishments (2015 - 2016 Session) 
During the 2016 legislative session, Magendanz was widely credited for helping to keep the state's charter schools open. Working with legislators from both parties Magendanz passed a new funding measure that drew upon the state's lottery fund to keep the eight charter schools in Washington open.

Magendanz has sponsored and passed legislation alleviating teacher shortages, improving vision screening in schools, addressing truancy reform and providing consumer protection for retirement communities. Other significant legislative accomplishments include the Washington Cybercrime Act, a computer science education bill and a bill regulating electronic vehicle infrastructure.

The Washington Cybercrime Act updates current statues to help prosecute crimes of electronic data interference, data theft, spoofing and tampering in the first and second degree.

Magendanz also sponsored legislation establishing distance and near-vision testing for students in all Washington State school districts.

House Bill 2573, which Magendanz co-sponsored, seeks to alleviate teacher shortages by helping with recruitment and retention and by removing barriers for out-of-state teachers to be certified in Washington. The legislation also expands scholarship opportunities for those pursuing a degree in education, and establishes alternative routes to teaching certification for experienced workers looking for a second career in education.

The Cybersecurity Jobs Act was designed to help the private sector develop assets to protect industries and infrastructure from cyber attack. The legislation creates a process for detecting and responding to security incidents.

Pre-2015 
In his time in the House of Representatives, Magendanz has focused on education, technology, and the interplay between the two.

During the 2014 legislative session, Magendanz helped get Senate Bill 6552 passed through the House. The legislation created a 24-credit high school diploma to boost science, technology, engineering and math instruction. It also gave local school districts more flexibility in teaching this topic.

That same session, Magendanz sponsored legislation that gave electric cars Washington state sales tax exemptions. Magendanz has also sponsored bills that created additional infrastructure for electric vehicles. The legislation offered financial incentives for utilities to build electric vehicle charging stations.

Magendanz also has an interest in computer science education. He co-sponsored legislation that adopted statewide computer science teaching standards, expanded scholarship eligibility for educators interested in professional development in computer science, and directed the creation of a computer science endorsement for educators interested in teaching computer science.

Education task force 
Magendanz has been appointed to three Washington state education task forces. The goal of these committees has been to increase funding for public schools in light of a Washington State Supreme Court ruling.

In the McCleary Decision the court ruled Washington state funding for public schools was unfair and insufficient to adequately educate the state's youth. Specifically, the court identified teacher salaries as an area the legislature had consistently underfunded. In response to this, the governor set up a series of education task forces to examine school funding. Magendanz currently sits on the nine-member committee.

The goal of the committee is to find ways to eliminate funding dependency on local levies by 2017. These levies are seen as an unstable funding source, potentially advantaging some school districts over others. Magendanz has spoken in favor of a revenue-neutral levy swap. This plan would raise no new taxes, but would rearrange existing funding in more sustainable and equitable ways.

References 

1967 births
Living people
Republican Party members of the Washington House of Representatives
School board members in Washington (state)
United States Navy officers
Cornell University alumni
21st-century American politicians